Ghetuputra Komola (Gheṭuputro Kômola, Pleasure Boy Komola) is a 2012 Bangladeshi musical film written and directed by Humayun Ahmed and produced by Impress Telefilm. The film is Humayan Ahmed's last film before his death. The film was selected as the Bangladeshi entry for the Best Foreign Language Oscar at the 85th Academy Awards, but it did not make the final shortlist.

Plot
The story takes place 150 years ago during the colonial era in a village called Jalshuka, in Habibganj. During that time a musical group was created called Ghetugaan where young boys danced in female clothing; those dancers were called "Ghetu". Soon they became famous among people but the landlords wanted them for sexual desires and gradually elite pederasty became recognized in the contemporary local society. The Ghetus used to get hired for the flood season. The story is about a teenage boy who is hired by a colonial era landlord to entertain his sexual desires until the annual flood is over. The movie starts with a young boy and his family, who are looking for work as they cannot work during the floods. The young boy and his father join a musical group, where the boy (komola) works as the Ghetu. The landlord sexually molests the young boy after the first dance performance. This pattern keeps repeating throughout the whole time that the musical group stays there. The landlord's wife becomes insecure after noticing his increasing obsession with komola. The landlord suggests keeping komola even after the floods end which angers his wife. She secretly orders her maid to push komola off the railings on the balcony where he usually likes to walk with his eyes closed. The maid, after one unsuccessful attempt, pushes the boy off and he dies.

Cast

Soundtrack

The film is scored by Maksud Jamil Mintu and several artists have rendered the songs.

Awards
 National Film Awards - Best Film
 National Film Awards - Best child artist-(Mamun)
 National Film Awards - Best screenwriter-(Humayun Ahmed)
 National Film Awards - Best Dialogue
 National Film Awards - Best Costume Design
 Meril Prothom Alo Awards - Best Film
 Meril Prothom Alo Awards - Best Director
 Meril Prothom Alo Awards - Best Screenplay

See also
 List of submissions to the 85th Academy Awards for Best Foreign Language Film
 List of Bangladeshi submissions for the Academy Award for Best Foreign Language Film

References

External links
 

2012 films
2012 drama films
2010s Bengali-language films
2010s musical drama films
Bengali-language Bangladeshi films
Bangladeshi musical drama films
Films scored by Maksud Jamil Mintu
Films scored by S I Tutul
Films directed by Humayun Ahmed
Films whose writer won the Best Screenplay National Film Award (Bangladesh)
Impress Telefilm films